Nola lucidalis is a moth of the family Nolidae first described by Francis Walker in 1864. It is found in the Indian subregion, Sri Lanka, Borneo, Java, the Philippines and Taiwan.

Description
Its forewings are triangular and whitish. A broad, oblique, dark brown band is found postmedially. The antemedial band is blackish and tapers from costa to dorsum.

References

Moths of Asia
Moths described in 1864
lucidalis